Dikwella, also known as Dickwella and as Dikwella South, is a small coastal market town in the Matara district in Southern province of Sri Lanka. Dikwella is noted for its long sandy beach which is protected by headlands, reefs and sand-bars, making it safer for swimming.

Walls in the rooms of the building behind the statue are decorated with a 'library' of colourful pictures depicting scenes from the life of the Buddha and punishments of miscreants.

Dikwella Market
Market Day is Saturday.

Dikwella Market is held next to the beach. It has been rebuilt after destruction in the 2004 Asian tsunami. Fortunately, Dikwella Market was not open that day, although traders and customers who'd travelled to nearby markets were lost.

Dikwella Peraheras

Dikwella usually has Peraheras to celebrate Vesak, Poson & Esala during May, June & July. These colourful Buddhist festivals usually include daytime and torch-lit night-time processions of caparisoned temple elephants, dancers and musicians. The size and pattern of these celebrations vary from year to year.

Dikwella beach

This long sandy beach is largely protected by headlands, reefs and sand-bars, making it safer for swimming.

The headlands have reefs along their rocks, close to the beach. At both the Pehambiya end and the western end, swimmers can snorkel out from the beach to watch colourful reef fish amongst the rocks.

Local inshore fishermen, especially at the sheltered Pehambiya end, mostly use colourful small Oru outrigger canoes which are easier to manoeuvre over the seasonal shifting sand-bars.

References

External links
 Dikwella, Sri Lanka
 Dikwella (Dikwella) - Sri Lanka (PDF)

Populated places in Southern Province, Sri Lanka
Populated places in Matara District
Seaside resorts in Sri Lanka
Suburbs of Matara, Sri Lanka